Scutellaria costaricana is a species of flowering plant in the mint family, Lamiaceae, that is native to Costa Rica and Panama. It is commonly known scarlet skullcap or Costa Rican skullcap and is a popular tropical houseplant.

References

External links
 
 

costaricana
Flora of Costa Rica
Flora of Panama
Plants described in 1863